Maissiat may refer to:
 Iliotibial tract (Maissiat's band), in anatomy
 Maissiat (1982-), French singer